The 1996 Penn State Nittany Lions football team represented the Pennsylvania State University in the 1996 NCAA Division I-A football season. The team was coached by Joe Paterno and played its home games in Beaver Stadium in University Park, Pennsylvania.

Schedule

Roster

NFL Draft
Three Nittany Lions were drafted in the 1997 NFL Draft.

References

Penn State
Penn State Nittany Lions football seasons
Lambert-Meadowlands Trophy seasons
Fiesta Bowl champion seasons
Penn State Nittany Lions football